Sihe Bridge is a bridge in Beijing.

It sits on the southern stretch of the 4th Ring Road.

Before the 4th Ring Road signpost change in September 2004, it was named Huaxiang Bridge as it was close to the locality of Huaxiang, which literally means "Flower Village". It is unknown why the name change took place, especially as the former name was representative—it was named after a village it was situated next to. The official line was that the bridge had its name changed because it took the "recommendations of the local Naming Bureau" (which is a small bureau in charge for naming localities). The "recommendations" as yet remain a mystery.

The only other reason mentioned officially was that the name was "inaccurate". The former name itself, plus the proximity of Huaxiang, would naturally turn that "reason" on itself immediately.

The new name was already put into use a few days into the ring road sign change, which began on September 5, 2004.

Politically, it is in Fengtai District.

References

Bridges in Beijing
Road bridges in China